Halle Pratt (born 6 October 1999) is a Canadian synchronized swimmer, joining the national team in 2017. Pratt won a gold medal in the team artistic swimming category at the 2019 Pan American Games. She placed sixth in the team competition at the 2016 FINA World Junior Synchronised Swimming Championships. Pratt was a training member of Canada's national team in the lead-up to the delayed 2020 Summer Olympics which were postponed as a result of the COVID-19 pandemic. Her brother is Cole Pratt who competes on Canada's competitive swimming team in the backstroke and medley events.

References

External links 
 

Living people
1999 births
Canadian synchronized swimmers
Artistic swimmers at the 2019 Pan American Games
Pan American Games gold medalists for Canada
Pan American Games medalists in synchronized swimming
Medalists at the 2019 Pan American Games
Swimmers from Edmonton
Synchronized swimmers at the 2020 Summer Olympics
Olympic synchronized swimmers of Canada
21st-century Canadian women